The Row Houses in Sycamore, Illinois are a small collection of historic terraced homes near the city's downtown. The building is considered by the National Register of Historic Places to be a contributing structure to the overall historic nature of the Sycamore Historic District. The district was added to the Register in May 1978. The buildings stand on the corner of Elm and California Streets in Sycamore.

References

Houses in DeKalb County, Illinois
Buildings and structures in Sycamore Historic District
Historic district contributing properties in Illinois
Houses on the National Register of Historic Places in Illinois
National Register of Historic Places in DeKalb County, Illinois